This is a list of 1989 events that occurred in Romania.

Incumbents
President: Nicolae Ceaușescu (until 22 December), Ion Iliescu (starting 26 December)
Prime Minister: Constantin Dăscălescu (until 25 December), Petre Roman (starting 26 December)

Events

March
 Six retired senior figures in the Romanian Communist Party, including Gheorghe Apostol and Silviu Brucan, write an open letter to Nicolae Ceaușescu.They call for the relaxation of Ceaușescu's demand for increased exports, the release of more food for internal consumption, the investment in new technology for the industries, the halt of a vastly expensive program of prestige projects of doubtful economic value and for the dictator to put an end to systematization.

April 
 President Nicolae Ceaușescu announces that Romania had paid all of its external debt.
 18 April – The localities of Aninoasa (Hunedoara County), Fundulea (Călărași County), Lehliu Gară (Călărași County), Mioveni (Argeș County) and Valea lui Mihai (Bihor County) are declared cities.

September 
 10 September - A Romanian cruiser carrying 179 people collides with a Bulgarian tugboat on the Danube, near Galați. Only 18 people are rescued from the cruiser.

November 
 20-25 November - The 14th party congress takes place.
 23 November – During the XIV Congress of the RCP, first shift workers from Timișoara Mechanical Works try to organize a revolt against the communist regime. Their movement is quelled by the Securitate organs.
 24 November – Nicolae Ceaușescu, the sole candidate for the communist party's leadership, is unanimously re-elected by the Central Committee as the general secretary of the Romanian Communist Party.

December 

 15 December - Demonstrators in Timișoara try perventing the arrest of Protestant clergyman László Tőkés.
 16 December – The Romanian Revolution begins in Timișoara when rioters break into the Committee Building and cause extensive vandalism. Their attempts to set the buildings on fire are foiled by military units.
 17 December - Nicolae Ceaușescu orders troops to fire on a crowd of protesters in Timișoara.
 19 December - Parts of Romania are reported to be under virtual martial law by Reuter.
 20 December – A general strike breaks out in all the factories in Timișoara. Timișoara is declared the first city free of communism in Romania.
 21 December
 A huge rally in Bucharest turns into chaos as firecrackers explode at the periphery of the gathering. Soldiers, tanks, APCs,  officers and Securitate officers dressed in civilian clothes crack on demonstrators, leaving casualties and significant material damage.
 Peaceful demonstrators in Arad, Brăila, Cluj-Napoca, Constanța, Hunedoara, Sibiu and Timișoara are shot dead by Securitate officers.

 22 December – Army units defect to the side of the demonstrators while the Ceaușescus flee and the Council of the National Salvation Front announces that is has overthrown the government.
 23 December - The Ceaușescu spouses are reported to have been captured.

 25 December – Ceaușescu spouses are summarily judged and executed outside the military garrison in Târgoviște.
 27 December – Petre Roman is appointed Prime Minister of the Government of Romania.
 28 December – For the first time, after a long break, is held a meeting of the Board of Writers' Union of Romania. Is elected a provisional steering committee, the president being Mircea Dinescu.
 29 December - The Socialist Republic of Romania is renamed as Romania.

 31 December – The Decree-Law no. 8 of 31 December 1989 issued by NSFC reintroduces the political pluralism in Romania.

Births 

 14 January – Dima Trofim, singer and former member of Lala Band
 28 January – Ruby, singer
 29 January – Adriana Țăcălie, handball player
 25 March – Andrei Leonte, singer and songwriter
 12 April – Antonia Iacobescu, singer and model
 18 May – Alexandru Chipciu, footballer (FC Steaua București)
 27 May – Doru Bratu, footballer (FC Steaua București)
 5 June – Roxana Cocoș, Olympic weightlifter
 10 June – Alexandra Stan, singer
 28 June – Bogdan Stancu, footballer (Gençlerbirliği S.K.)
 15 September – Steliana Nistor, former artistic gymnast
 3 November – Sore Mihalache, singer and former member of Lala Band
 7 November – Jimmy Dub, singer
 14 November
 Raluka, singer
 Vlad Chiricheș, footballer (Tottenham Hotspur F.C.)
 22 November – Gabriel Torje, footballer (RCD Espanyol)

Deaths

January 
5 January – Philip Herschkowitz, composer and musicologist (b. 1906)
6 January – Marcel Budală, accordionist (b. 1926)
10 January – Chris Avram, actor (b. 1931)
15 January – Surian Borali, footballer (b. 1960)
23 January – Nicolae Al. Rădulescu, geographer, member of the Romanian Academy (b. 1905)

March 
2 March – Liviu Cornel Babeș, electrician and painter (b. 1942)
6 March – Vasile Netea, writer and historian (b. 1912)
22 March – Ștefan Niculescu, lieutenant colonel in World War II (b. 1908)
25 March
Nina Behar, documentary filmmaker (b. 1930)
Radu-Eugeniu Gheorghiu, composer and instrumentist (b. 1915)
29 March – Nicolae Steinhardt Orthodox hermit and writer (b. 1912)

April 
2 April – Tudor Vornicu, journalist and television producer (b. 1926)
8 April – Horia Demian, basketball player (b. 1942)
19 April – Iosif Keber, painter (b. 1897)
20 April – Doru Davidovici, aviator and writer (b. 1945)
23 April – Ioniță G. Andron, photographic artist, Greek Catholic theologian and lawyer (b. 1917)

May 
 2 or 3 May – Roland Kirsch, writer (b. 1960)
5 May – Alexandru Țitruș, popular music violinist (b. 1922)
11 May – Naum Corcescu, sculptor (b. 1922)
29 May – Adrian Petringenaru , film director (b. 1933)

June 
2 June – Grigore Kiazim, lautar instrumentist (b. 1931)
20 June – Traian Dorz – poet and political prisoner (b. 1914)
30 June
 Vasile Petre Jitariu, biologist, member of the Romanian Academy (b. 1905)
 Petre Lupu, politician (b. 1920)

July 
6 July – Alexandru Pașcanu, composer (b. 1920)
7 July – Horia Stamatu, writer and journalist (b. 1912)
11 July – Horia Macellariu – counter admiral (b. 1894)
25 July – Emil Gavriș – popular music singer (b. 1915)

August 
30 August – Costin Murgescu, economist, jurist, journalist and diplomat (b. 1919)
31 August – Dinu Kivu, theatre and film critic (b. 1942)

September 
17 September – Ion D. Sîrbu, philosopher and writer (b. 1919)
29 September – Alexandru Cosmescu, journalist, writer and anthologist (b. 1922)

October 
15 October – Paul Georgescu, literary critic and journalist (b. 1923)

November 
1 November – Mihaela Runceanu, singer and vocal techniques teacher (b. 1955)
19 November – Zoltán Vadász, actor (b. 1926)
25 November – György Bözödi, writer, sociologist and historian (b. 1913)
28 November
 Arsenie Boca, Romanian Orthodox monk, theologian and artist (b. 1910)
 Ion Popescu-Gopo, graphic artist and animator (b. 1923)

December 

12 December – Ioan Zugrăvescu, chemist, member of the Romanian Academy (b. 1910)
17 December
 Anton Breitenhofer, journalist, writer and politician (b. 1912)
 Gheorghe Vlădescu-Răcoasa, sociologist and politician (b. 1895)
18 December – Franz Liebhard, writer (b. 1899)
19 December – Alexandru Mitru, writer (b. 1914)
20 December – Ioan Moraru, medical doctor, member of the Romanian Academy (b. 1927)
22 December – Vasile Milea, politician and general officer (b. 1927)
23 December
Velicu Mihalea, general officer (birth date unknown)
Constantin Nuță, general officer (birth date unknown)
25 December
Nicolae Ceaușescu, leader of the Socialist Republic of Romania (b. 1918)
Elena Ceaușescu, Nicolae Ceaușescu's wife (b. 1916)
Florică Murariu, rugby union player (b. 1955)
27 December – Horia Căciulescu, actor (b. 1922)
28 December
Marin Ceaușescu, economist and diplomat (b. 1916)
 Hermann Oberth, inventor and pioneer of astronautics (b. 1894)

Full date unknown 
Nuni Anestin, actor (b. 1941)
Constantin Celăreanu, aviator in World War II (b. 1890)
Grigore Osipov-Sinești, stomatologist (b. 1907)
Irimie Staicu, agronomic engineer and agrotechnician, member of the Romanian Academy (b. 1905)
Nicu Stoenescu, romance and tango singer (b. 1911)
Mircea Șeptilici, actor (b. 1912)

References

Citations

Bibliography 

 

Years of the 20th century in Romania
1980s in Romania
 
Romania
Romania